Jean-Reck Ah Fock (born 9 February 1983) is a Mauritian footballer who currently plays as a striker for PAS Mates. He won three caps for the Mauritius national football team in 2002.

References

1983 births
Living people
Mauritian footballers
Mauritius international footballers
Association football forwards